This article shows all participating team squads at the 2007 Women's Pan-American Volleyball Cup, held from June 19 to June 30, 2007 in

Colima Mexico.

Head Coach: Carlos Di Leonardo

Head Coach: Luizomar De Moura

Head Coach: Naoki Miyashita

Head Coach: Eladio Vargas

Head Coach: Antonio Perdomo

Head Coach: Beato Miguel Cruz

Head Coach: Macario González

Head Coach: Enio de Figueiredo

Head Coach: Juan Carlos Núñez

Head Coach: Francisco Cruz Jiménez

Head Coach: Lang Ping

Head Coach: Rafael Codina

References

External links
NORCECA

S
P